Eucallipterus tiliae, also known as the linden aphid or lime-tree aphid, is a member of the family Aphididae. Native to Eurasia in recent times, it is now found worldwide wherever species of Tilia occur.

Adults are readily identified by a black stripe along the body and a cloudy-black wing edge. Ornamental trees along streets and parking areas are often populated by these insects, leaving a sticky residue (honeydew) on the ground below and causing a black mould to grow on the leaves. Numbers increase continuously over the growing season of the host plant, and because of the gregarious nature of these insects large aggregations are common. Ten species of Ichneumonoidea, nine of Chalcidoidea, various Coccinellidae, and Trioxys curvicaudus are recorded as parasitoids on Eucallipterus.

The distribution of young and mature aphids on the leaf surfaces is dictated by their stylet length - the short stylets of young aphids cannot penetrate the lignin of the sclerenchyma of large veins and are thus restricted to feeding on smaller veins.

References

Panaphidini
Hemiptera of Asia
Hemiptera of Europe